Lluís Graner i Arrufí, or Arrufat in Spanish (5 February 1863–7 May 1929) was a Spanish painter in the Realistic style.

Biography 
He was born in Barcelona, and studied at the Escola de la Llotja from 1883, with Antoni Caba (color/composition) and Benet Mercadé (drawing).

During his final year at school, he received a grant to study in Madrid, where he copied and learned from the Old Masters at the Museo del Prado. After that, supported by a fellowship, he moved to Paris and became a member of the Academie des Beaux-Arts. Later, he returned to Barcelona, but continued to travel to cities throughout Europe, including Berlin, Munich and Düsseldorf.

Influenced by Richard Wagner's concept of "Gesamtkunstwerk" (Total Work of Art), he was motivated to create his own total art experience and organized the "Sala Mercè" (Mercy Hall) in Barcelona's Rambla District. The project involved contributors from every artistic discipline, including the new field of cinematography. The room was decorated by Antoni Gaudí. Other participants included Adrià Gual, Santiago Rusiñol, Ramon Casas, Enric Clarasó, Enric Morera and Enrique Granados. Despite some early public enthusiasm, the endeavor was ultimately a failure and the Hall closed it doors in 1908, after only four years, obliging him to survive by painting portraits for wealthy clients.

In his later years, he left Spain, living successively in Havana, New York and several other places while travelling to Santiago, Buenos Aires and Rio de Janeiro. During these years, he lived almost entirely on money sent to him by his friends. He returned to Barcelona in 1928, the year before his death, and held a major show at the Hotel Ritz. He died in Barcelona.

Selected paintings

References

Further reading 
 DDAA, La col•lecció Raimon Casellas (1992), Publicacions del MNAC/Museo del Prado  (Catalog from the Exhibition of the same name, held at the Palau Nacional from July 28 to September 20, 1992)

External links

 ArtNet: More works by Graner

1863 births
1929 deaths
Painters from Catalonia
19th-century Spanish painters
19th-century Spanish male artists
Spanish male painters
20th-century Spanish painters
20th-century Spanish male artists